Micreremidae is a family of oribatids in the order Oribatida. There are at least 4 genera and about 14 described species in Micreremidae.

Genera
 Fenichelia Balogh, 1970
 Mexiceremus J. & P. Balogh, 1998
 Micreremus Berlese, 1908
 Phylloribatula Balogh & Mahunka, 1978

References

Further reading

 
 
 
 

Acariformes
Acari families